Reparation is a theological concept closely connected with those of atonement and satisfaction. In ascetical theology, 
reparation is the making of amends for insults given to God through sin, either one's own or another's. The response of man is to be reparation through adoration, prayer, and sacrifice. In Roman Catholic tradition, an act of reparation is a prayer or devotion with the intent to expiate the "sins of others", e.g. for the repair of the sin of blasphemy, the sufferings of Jesus Christ or as Acts of Reparation to the Virgin Mary.

Theological perspective
According to Thomas Slater, writing in the Catholic Encyclopedia, reparation is a theological concept closely connected with those of atonement and satisfaction, and is considered a sacred mystery in Roman Catholicism. Although God could have chosen to accept the sins of humanity, in divine providence, he instead judged it better to demand satisfaction through reparation and penance for sins of humanity. In Catholic teaching, it is better for the education of man that wrongdoing on humanity's part should entail the necessity of making satisfaction; this satisfaction was made adequately to God by the suffering, passion and death of Jesus Christ. By voluntarily submitting to his passion and death on the cross, Jesus thus atoned for man's disobedience and sin, and made reparation to God for the offenses of humanity.

In Catholic teaching, through the merits obtained by the death of Jesus, mankind is restored to grace, which enables humanity to add prayers, works and trials to those of Jesus "and fill up those things that are wanting of the sufferings of Christ, in my flesh, for his body, which is the church" (Colossians 1:24). Mankind thus makes reparation to the justice of God for their sins, and by virtue of the Communion of the Saints, the oneness and solidarity of the mystical Body of Christ, can also make satisfaction and reparation for the sins of others.

Duty of reparation

In the encyclical  Pope Pius XI said:

History
In the 17th century, Christianity had seen some great profanations of the Blessed Sacrament, which renewed attention to the atonement dimension of adoration and gave rise to various societies for the Blessed Sacrament. In 1654 Catherine de Bar founded the Benedictine Nuns of Perpetual Adoration of the Blessed Sacrament in Paris.

Some Catholic organizations whose focus was reparation included the Archconfraternity of Reparation for blasphemy and the neglect of Sunday, founded by Bishop Pierre Louis Parisis in 1847; and the Archconfraternity of the Holy Face, founded by Leo Dupont in 1851. In 1886 Pope Leo XIII authorized the formation of the Archconfraternity of the Mass of Reparation in Rome. The Prayerful Sodality founded by Hildebrand Gregori in 1950 became the Congregation of the Benedictine Sisters of the Reparation of the Holy Face in 1977.

Methods
The Mass, the re-presentation of the sacrifice of Calvary, was according to Thomas Aquinas specially suited to make reparation for sin. But some caution has been called for here following the impact of scriptural studies on Catholic theology after the Second Vatican Council; notions of God's wrath that are more characteristic of the early Hebrew scriptures and of tension between the Father and the Son have yielded to a Trinitarian focus on "the self-offering of believers in union with Christ by which they share in his covenant relationship with the Father."

Acts of Reparation to The Holy Trinity
The Fatima prayer to the Holy Trinity is based on the purported 20th century apparitions of Our Lady of Fatima, and is attributed to an angel who appeared to the visionaries. It is sometimes called the Angel Prayer.

Prayers of reparation 

A number of prayers such as the Act of Reparation to the Virgin Mary appeared in the Raccolta, a collection of Catholic prayers and good works with attached indulgences. The Raccolta included a number of diverse prayers for reparation. The Raccolta was deprecated in 1968.

 the Chaplet of the Holy Wounds (which does not include the usual rosary mysteries) focuses on specific redemptive aspects of Christ's suffering in Calvary, with emphasis on the souls in purgatory.
 the Act of Reparation to Jesus Christ and for the reparation of blasphemy is the Golden Arrow prayer first introduced by Sister Marie of St Peter in 1844. This devotion was approved by Pope Leo XIII in 1885.

First Fridays communion of reparation

The idea of reparation is an essential element in the Roman Catholic devotion to the Sacred Heart of Jesus.
Receiving Holy Communion as part of the first Fridays devotion is a Catholic devotion to offer reparations for sins through the Sacred Heart of Jesus. In the visions of Christ reported by Margaret Mary Alacoque in the 17th century, several promises were made to those people that practiced the first Friday devotions, one of which included final perseverance.

The devotion consists of several practices that are performed on each first Friday of nine consecutive months. On these days, a person is to attend Mass and receive communion. In many Catholic communities the practice of the Holy Hour of meditation during the exposition of the Blessed Sacrament during the First Fridays is encouraged.

First Thursdays adoration of reparation

Practicing Eucharistic adoration before the tabernacle (especially made in front of the most forgotten and abandoned tabernacles) as part of the first Thursdays devotion is a Catholic devotion to offer reparation for the Holy Wounds of Christ. In the visions of Christ reported by Alexandrina of Balazar in the 20th century, several promises were made by Jesus to those who practice the First Thursdays Devotion, one of which included the salvation of the soul at the moment of death.

The devotion consists of several practices that are performed on the first Thursdays of six consecutive months. The number six represents Jesus five wounds of the Crucifixion (hands, feet, and side) plus his shoulder wound from carrying the Cross. On these days, a person is to attend Mass and receive the Eucharist in a state of grace "with sincere humility, fervor and love" and spend one hour before a church tabernacle containing the Eucharist, meditating on the wounds of Jesus (particularly his shoulder wound) and the sorrows of Mary.

Apparitions

Some Marian apparitions have mentioned the need for reparation.

The messages of Our Lady of Fátima also emphasized the need for reparations. According to the child seers, Mary asked them to make sacrifices to save sinners.

See also
Acts of Reparation to the Virgin Mary
Acts of Reparation to Jesus Christ
The Golden Arrow Holy Face Devotion (Prayer)

Notes

References

Citations

Sources

External links
 Archconfraternity of the Mass of Reparation

 
Christian terminology
Catholic spirituality